Goodfellow Air Force Base is a nonflying United States Air Force base located in San Angelo, Texas, United States.  As part of Air Education and Training Command, Goodfellow's main mission is cryptologic and intelligence training for the Air Force, Space Force, Army, Coast Guard, Navy, and Marine Corps. Military firefighters are also trained here as part of the 312th Training Squadron. It is the home of the 17th Training Wing. The base is named for World War I aviator First Lieutenant John J. Goodfellow Jr.

History
Goodfellow's history traces to the days before the attack on Pearl Harbor, but its name registered the valor and sacrifice of an earlier conflict. On 14 September 1918, First Lieutenant John J. Goodfellow Jr., of San Angelo, Texas, boarded his Salmson 2A2 observation plane at Gondreville Airfield in France to conduct visual reconnaissance behind enemy lines. The mission was part of a larger undertaking just underway, a major American offensive intended to reduce the German salient near Saint-Mihiel. Unfortunately, adverse weather permitted observation only at a low altitude that exposed the lumbering Salmson to enemy pursuit. Three days later, the offensive a success, the young pilot's remains were recovered from his ruined craft and interred at the St. Mihiel American Cemetery and Memorial near Nancy, Meurthe-et-Moselle.

World War II

The peace that arrived two months later endured a mere two decades more. Constrained by neutrality legislation, but witness to the aggression across Europe, Africa, and Asia, President Franklin Delano Roosevelt began a program of preparedness that included the construction of facilities dedicated to advanced air training. Several such bases were envisioned for Texas and one, specifically, for the Fort Worth-Midland-San Angelo triangle. Civic leaders from San Angelo immediately commended their community to the U.S. War Department.

Construction of the new San Angelo Air Corps Basic Flying School began at once. Officially established on 17 August 1940, the base was ready for occupancy by 21 January 1941, and the first classes of students soon arrived. On 11 June 1941, in dedication to a young hero and in tribute to the community that shaped him, the base was officially renamed Goodfellow Field.

In the next four years, more than 10,000 trained pilots were graduated, and many were decorated for outstanding heroism in action against Germany, Italy, and Japan.

United States Air Force
The Axis collapse did not remove the need for the Goodfellow training. Pilots continued to be trained there, primarily for large, multiengine piston and turboprop aircraft, first on the AT-6 Texan, the T-28 Trojan, and then, beginning in 1954, on the twin-engine TB-25 and B-25 Mitchell. The 3545th Basic Pilot Training Wing gave pilot instruction from 1948. On 3 September 1958, with nearly 20,000 aviators to its credit, Goodfellow graduated its last class of pilots. Air Training Command (ATC) was transitioning to new Cessna T-37 Tweet and Northrop T-38 Talon aircraft for Undergraduate Pilot Training that required minimum 8000-ft (2400-m) runway lengths, far longer than Goodfellow's 5500-ft primary runways.

With the transfer of the base from ATC to the U.S. Air Force Security Service (USAFSS), Goodfellow's mission became the training of Air Force personnel in the advanced cryptologic skills that the Security Service required. After the changeover, the 6940th Air Base Wing administered the base and later, after a name change, provided decryption training. Eight years later, in 1966, the mission expanded further to include joint-service training in these same skills for U.S. Army, U.S. Navy, and U.S. Marine Corps personnel.

Although flight operations at Goodfellow decreased dramatically after 1958, minimal activities continued with both transient aircraft and locally based Cessna U-3 Administrators (1958–1971), DeHavilland U-6 Beavers (1960–1966), Piasecki H-21, CH-21, and HH-21 Workhorse helicopters (1958–1966), and Cessna O-2 Skymasters (1972–1975). Goodfellow's runways were permanently closed in March 1975.

After 38 years of pilot and then intelligence training, Goodfellow's mission had apparently come to a close with the announcement in 1978 that the base would revert to ATC and was a candidate for closure. Since it was a single-mission facility, its mission could perhaps be executed more economically elsewhere. Nevertheless, the 3480th Technical Training Wing of Air Training Command was activated at the base on 1 July 1978. On 3 January 1984 the wing gained the suffix USAF Cryptological Training Center.

By then, senior intelligence personnel had already begun seriously to contemplate the consolidation of all Air Force-managed intelligence training at one location. The site selected for intelligence training consolidation was Goodfellow, and the base was designated a technical training center on 1 March 1985. The Goodfellow Technical Training Center continued to supervise the 3480th Technical Training Wing.

During the next three years, intelligence training consolidation brought to Goodfellow advanced imagery training from Offutt Air Force Base, Nebraska; electronic intelligence operations training from Keesler Air Force Base, Mississippi; and targeting, intelligence applications, and general intelligence training from Lowry Air Force Base, Colorado, as a result of Lowry's identification for closure under Base Realignment and Closure (BRAC). The successful completion of intelligence training consolidation on 30 June 1988 further facilitated the development of intelligence training integration, a multidisciplinary approach to the training of intelligence professionals.

In 1992, as part of Air Force size reductions, ATC was inactivated, replaced by the Air Education and Training Command, which became base's "parent" major command. The 3480 Technical Training Wing was reduced to the 3480 Technical Training Group on 1 February 1992 and then redesignated as the 391 Technical Training Group on 15 September 1992.

On 1 July 1993, the 17th Training Wing was activated on Goodfellow AFB. With the change in name came a marked diversification and increase in Goodfellow's mission. Base Realignment and Closure rounds one and two transferred special instruments training from the former Lowry AFB and fire protection training from the former Chanute Air Force Base, Illinois, to Goodfellow. To support the increased training load, Goodfellow underwent extensive modernization and growth. With new training facilities, dormitories, dining halls, a commissary, a youth center, and a physical fitness center.

On February 18, 1995 Louis Jones Jr., kidnapped Private Tracie McBride from Goodfellow AFB before raping and murdering her.

Based units 
These flying and notable nonflying units are based at Goodfellow Air Force Base.

Units marked GSU are geographically separate units, which although based at Goodfellow, are subordinate to a parent unit based at another location.

United States Air Force
Air Education and Training Command (AETC)
 Second Air Force
 17th Training Wing (host wing)
 17th Comptroller Squadron
 17th Training Group
 17th Training Support Squadron
 312th Training Squadron
 313th Training Squadron
 315th Training Squadron
 316th Training Squadron
 17th Medical Group
 17th Medical Operations Squadron
 17th Medical Support Squadron
 17th Mission Support Group
 17th Civil Engineer Squadron
 17th Communications Squadron
 17th Contracting Squadron
 17th Logistics Readiness Squadron
 17th Security Forces Squadron
 17th Force Support Squadron

United States Army 
Training and Doctrine Command
 111th Military Intelligence Brigade
 344th Military Intelligence Battalion (GSU)
 Alpha Company
 Bravo Company
 Charlie Company
 U.S. Army Engineer School
 1st Engineer Brigade
 169th Engineer Battalion
 Fire-fighter Detachment (GSU)

United States Marine Corps 
 Marine Corps Detachment

United States Navy 
Naval Education and Training Command
 Center for Information Warfare Training (GSU)

Facilities
These are some of the facilities at Goodfellow AFB:
 Dining facilities
 Western Winds
 Cressman
 Recreation facilities
 Gymnasiums (2)
 Swimming pools (2)
 Bowling alley
 Movie theater
 Base library
 Several dormitories
 Goodfellow AFB Library
 Crossroads Chapel fellowship center
 Army, Navy, and Marine Corps tenant units
 Angelo Inn billeting
 Louis F. Garland Fire Academy
 Lakeside Recreation Center at Lake Nasworthy
 Ross Medical Clinic

Miscellaneous
In April 1951, Madonna's parents met for the first time when they attended the wedding of her maternal uncle, Sgt. Dale Fortin, at the airbase chapel.

See also

 List of United States Air Force installations
 Texas World War II Army Airfields

References

 
 Manning, Thomas A. (2005), History of Air Education and Training Command, 1942–2002.  Office of History and Research, Headquarters, AETC, Randolph AFB, Texas 
 Shaw, Frederick J. (2004), Locating Air Force Base Sites, History’s Legacy, Air Force History and Museums Program, United States Air Force, Washington DC.

External links
 
 Go Goodfellow – Base force support squadron
 
 
 

Installations of the United States Air Force in Texas
Buildings and structures in San Angelo, Texas
Initial United States Air Force installations
USAF Air Training Command Installations
Military airbases established in 1940
1940 establishments in Texas